Stasin  is a village in the administrative district of Gmina Chodel, within Opole Lubelskie County, Lublin Voivodeship, in eastern Poland. It is surrounded by Radlin, Ludwinów,  Leszczyna, Ratoszyn Drugi and Kępa-Kolonia

References

Stasin